Hurvat Amudim or Sde Amudim was an ancient village, now an archaeological site, in Israel, located south-east of the Beit Netofa Valley, on the eastern side of Highway 65 between Golani Interchange and Kadarim Junction.

History
The name derives from the columns that once supported the roof of the synagogue and that remained standing.

G. Dalman suggested identifying the site with Kefar Uzziel, mentioned in rabbinical sources and home to one of the 24 priestly families that settled in the Galilee from the 2nd century CE onward, owing to the similar sounding name of the nearby Arab-village, Uzeir (believed to be a corruption of "Uzziel"). The town was abandoned in the late 4th century.

Synagogue
A synagogue, one of the largest in the Galilee (25 x 14 meters), was built at the end of the 3rd century or the beginning of the 4th century. The building featured two rows of columns. An Aramaic inscription in the floor mosaic reads: "Remembered well... bar Tanhum, who made this pavement of mosaic and roof. May he be blessed. Amen. Selah." A second inscription reads, "Yo'ezer the hazan and Simeon his brother made this gate of the Lord of Heaven."

See also
 Oldest synagogues in the world
 Archaeology in Israel

References

External links

Images of Hurvat Amudim at the Manar al-Athar photo archive

Ancient synagogues in the Land of Israel
Archaeological sites in Israel
Former populated places in Israel
Buildings and structures in Northern District (Israel)
Protected areas of Northern District (Israel)
3rd-century establishments in the Roman Empire